Thelymitra apiculata, commonly called Cleopatra's needles, is a species of orchid in the family Orchidaceae and endemic to the south-west of Western Australia. It has a single erect, curved, dark green leaf with a purplish base and up to twelve purplish flowers with darker blotches and golden yellow edges. There are two yellow arms on the sides of the column, each ending with a needle-like point.

Description
There are two erect yellow arms on the sides of the column, each ending in a needle-like point. Flowering occurs from late May to July.

Taxonomy and naming
Cleopatra's needles was first formally described in 1984 by Alex George from a specimen collected near Badgingarra and given the name Thelymitra variegata var. apiculata. The description was published in Nuytsia. In 1989 David Jones and Mark Clements raised the variety to species status as T. apiculata. The specific epithet (apiculata) is a Latin word meaning "small pointed", referring to the short, needle-like tip of the column arms.

Distribution and habitat
Thelymitra apiculata grows with low shrubs on top of low lateritic hills in the Geraldton Sandplains, Jarrah Forest and Swan Coastal Plain biogeographic regions.

Conservation
Thelymitra apiculata is classified as "Priority Four" by the Government of Western Australia Department of Parks and Wildlife, meaning that is rare or near threatened.

References

apiculata
Endemic orchids of Australia
Orchids of Western Australia
Plants described in 1984